New Bridge High School is a public high school in Grants Pass, Oregon, United States. It is located at the Rogue Valley Youth Correctional Facility. New Bridge first started teaching students in December 1997.

References

High schools in Josephine County, Oregon
Grants Pass, Oregon
Public high schools in Oregon